Chloe Wise (b. December 6, 1990) is a Canadian artist based in New York City. Wise works in sculpture, drawing, video art, and oil painting. Wise is known for her stylized and humorous  approach to both still life and figurative painting that incorporate intimate depictions of food trends, agriculture, consumer culture, friends, and muses. 

In 2014, actor Bobbi Menuez attended a Chanel launch event wearing Wise's sculpture, "Bagel No. 5," a realistic sculpture of a bagel with cream cheese adorned with a Chanel purse chain and charm. The sculpture was believed to be a real purse designed by Chanel, until it was revealed that the "bag" was part of a collection created by Wise.

Early life and education
Wise was born in Montreal, Quebec. 

Wise graduated from Concordia University in 2013 with a degree in Fine Arts and Art History.

Work
In 2013, Wise began a collection of sculptures featuring different kinds of bread adorned with designer labels modeled after various It bags. The sculptures were made out of urethane and oil paint and finished with a designer label or charm along with straps to make it look like a functional bag or purse. The collection began with a play on the Louis Vuitton "baguettes," in which Wise created a bread mold of a baguette out of urethane and then painted it with oil paints to resemble a real loaf of bread. She then drilled into the sculpture to add straps and a Louis Vuitton charm. The collection also includes a Prada backpack made of a sculpted, braided challah loaf titled Ain't No Challah Back Girl, and another piece with a sculpted bagel with cream cheese completed with a Chanel chain and charm called Bagel No. 5.

Wise's first gallery show with Almine Rech, Of false beaches and butter money, in Paris, France in 2017. 

Two more exhibitions with Almine Rech took place in 2019, Lineup in New York and Not That We Don’t in London.

In 2019, designer Simon Porte Jacquemus worked with Wise to illustrate the designer's Spring 2019 campaign.

Wise's first institutional exhibition was in 2019 at Herning Museum of Contemporary Art, Denmark, titled And Everything Was True.

For the 2021 exhibition, Thank You For The Nice Fire, at Almine Rech Gallery, a reference to a scene in Don DeLillo’s White Noise. Wise continued to depict up close paintings friends-as-muses, like model and photographer Richie Shazam, as well as trompe-l'oeil chandeliers and sconces that looked like romaine lettuce covered in caesar dressing. Wise also had work at Fantasy America at The Andy Warhol Museum in Pittsburgh.

Themes 
Wise often critiques consumer culture, commercialization, ideas of wellness, and the self-construction of identity with a balance of comedy and sincere optimism. Wise employs comedic and satirical strategies while using references to art history, such as the pronkstillevens that inspired sculptures in her exhibition Of false beaches and butter money. Through this manner, Wise "teases out conventions, but by implicating herself in the joke."

Solo exhibitions

Thank You For The Nice Fire, Almine Rech, New York, NY, 2021
Second Nature, Almine Rech, online, New York, NY, 2020 
And Everything Was True, HEART Herning Museum of Contemporary Art, Herning, Denmark, 2019
Not That We Don't, Almine Rech, London, England, 2019
Tennis Elbow, The Journal Gallery, New York, NY, 2019
Coast unclear seeks rained parade, Galerie Sébastien Bertrand, Geneva, Switzerland, 2018 
Of false beaches and butter money, Almine Rech, Paris, France, 2017 
Cats not fighting is a horrible sound as well, Galerie Division, Montreal, Canada, 2016 
Full-Size Body, Erotic Literature, Retrospective Gallery, Hudson, NY, 2015 
That's Something Else, My Sweet, Galerie Sébastien Bertrand, Geneva, Switzerland, 2015 
pissing, shmoozing and looking away, Galerie Division, Montreal, and Division Gallery, Toronto, Canada, 2015

Publications 

 Chloe Wise: Second Nature, 2021, Almine Rech Editions
 Chloe Wise, 2016, Division Gallery (Canada) and Galerie Sebastien Bertrand (Switzerland)

Collections 

 The Julia Stoschek Collection, Dusseldorf, Germany 
 The Hammer Museum, Los Angeles, CA 
 National Gallery of Canada, Ottawa, ON

References 

1990 births
Living people
Canadian women painters
Canadian women sculptors
Canadian video artists
Women video artists
Artists from Montreal
Artists from New York City
Concordia University alumni
Sculptors from Quebec